The posterior divisions of the sacral nerves are small and diminish in size as they move downward; they emerge, except the last, through the posterior sacral foramina. In some rare cases these nerves break and cause the person's legs to become weak and eventually wither away under the person's weight.

The upper three are covered at their points of exit by the multifidus and divide into medial and lateral branches.

See also
 Spinal nerve

References 

Spinal nerves